

Governor and Lieutenant Governor

Seven tickets ran for the Democratic nomination for governor of Florida.

Jim Williams, the lieutenant governor, ran for governor with former state Senator Betty Castor of Florida, as his running mate. Hans G. Tanzler, the mayor of Jacksonville, ran with Manuel "Manolo" Arques, a Cuban-American real estate and insurance executive from Miami. State Secretary of State Bruce Smathers (who resigned to run) ran with state Representative Charles W. Boyd.

Claude R. Kirk, Jr. of Palm Beach, who was the Republican governor of Florida from 1967 to 1971, returned to the party he left 28 years prior, switching his party affiliation to Democratic on July 5, 1978 (the month prior re-registering as an independent and launching an abortive signature drive to get on the ballot as an independent. He chose as his running mate Mary L. Singleton, the former director of the state Division of Elections and the first black woman to sit on the Jacksonville City Council.

Democratic primary
Leroy Eden/Maria Kay - 13,864 (1.3%)
Bob Graham/Wayne Mixson - 261,972 (25.2%)
Claude R. Kirk, Jr./Mary L. Singleton - 62,534 (6.0%)
Robert L. Shevin/Jim Glisson - 364,732 (35.2%)
Bruce A. Smathers/Charles W. Boyd - 85,298 (8.2%)
Hans G. Tanzler/Manuel Arques - 124,706 (12.0%)
Jim Williams/Betty Castor - 124,427 (12.0%)

Republican primary
Jack Eckerd/Paula Hawkins - 244,394 (63.8%)
Lou Frey, Jr./S. Peter Capua - 138,437 (36.2%)

Democratic primary runoff
Bob Graham/Wayne Mixson - 482,535 (53.5%)
Robert L. Shevin/Jim Glisson - 418,636 (46.5%)

General election
Bob Graham/Wayne Mixson (DEM) - 1,406,580 (55.6%)
Jack Eckerd/Paula Hawkins (REP) - 1,123,888 (44.4%)

Attorney general

Democratic primary
Alan Becker - 232,416 (26.7%)
Barry Richard - 231,518 (26.6%)
Jim Smith - 407,579 (46.8%)

Democratic primary runoff
Alan Becker - 329,455  (39.9%)
Jim Smith - 497,255 (60.1%)

Secretary of State

Democratic primary
Beverly F. Dozier - 224,990 (25.4%)
Jim Fair - 81,389 (9.2%)
George Firestone - 253,395 (28.7%)
Joe Little - 103,275 (11.7%)
Richard "Dick" Renick - 221,022 (25.0%)

Democratic primary runoff
Beverly F. Dozier - 342,661  (42.1%)
George Firestone - 472,072 (57.9%)

General election
George Firestone (DEM) - 1,278,658 (55.0%)
Ander Crenshaw (REP) - 1,045,703 (45.0%)

Comptroller

Democratic primary
Don Dansby - 159,238 (18.7%)
Gerald (Jerry) Lewis - 691,583 (81.3%)

Treasurer

Democratic primary
Bill Gunter - 735,523  (80.1%)
Don Hazelton - 182,907 (19.9%)

General election
Bill Gunter (DEM) - 1,758,435 (74.8%)
Jeffrey L. Latham (REP) - 591,730 (25.2%)

Commissioner of Education

Ralph D. Turlington (DEM) - 1,436,240 (63.9%)
Herman B. Williams (REP) - 811,770 (36.1%)

United States House of Representatives

1st congressional district
Democratic primary - Runoff Indicated
Curtis Golden - 29,692 (31.4%)
Earl Hutto  - 39,982 (42.3%)
Jerry G. Melvin - 21,186  (22.4%)
Lewis H. "Ike" Williams - 3,687 (3.9%)

Democratic primary runoff
Curtis Golden - 35,721 (38.0%)
Earl Hutto - 58,352 (62.0%)

General election
Earl Hutto (DEM) - 85,608 (63.3%)
Warren Briggs (REP) - 49,715 (36.7%)

2nd congressional district
Democratic primary
Don Fuqua - 83,308 (85.5%)
Anthony P. (Tony) Wesolowski - 14,081 (14.5%)

General election
Don Fuqua (DEM) - 112,649 (81.7%)
Pete Brathwaite (REP) - 25,148 (18.3%)

4th congressional district
Bill Chappell (DEM) - 113,302 (73.1%)
Tom Boney (REP) - 41,647 (26.9%)

5th congressional district
Democratic primary - Runoff Indicated
Adrian Bell, Jr. - 12,942 (20.8%)
David Best - 21,410 (34.5%)
Mike Olson - 18,805 (30.3%)
Don Poindexter - 8,981 (14.5%)

Democratic primary runoff
David Best  - 32,573 (56.6%)
Mike Olson - 24,945 (43.4%)

General election
David Best (DEM) - 101,867 (48.9%)
Richard Kelly (REP) - 106,319 (51.1%)

6th congressional district
Jim Christison (DEM) - 40,654 (21.2%)
C. W. Bill Young (REP) - 150,694 (78.8%)

7th congressional district
Democratic primary
Sam M. Gibbons - 49,766 (69.1%)
Don Gore - 1,928 (2.7%)
Richard Salem - 20,338 (28.2%)

9th congressional district
Democratic primary
Bill Nelson - 36,565 (86.0%)
Curtis R. Sears - 5,955 (14.0%)

Republican primary
Frank Daley - 10,417 (29.5%)
Edward Gurney - 24,844 (70.5%)

General election'
Bill Nelson (DEM) - 89,543 (61.5%)
Edward J. Gurney (REP) - 56,074 (38.5%)

11th congressional district
Democratic primary
John J. Considine - 20,689 (31.4%)
Robert E. Lockwood - 9,286  (14.1%)
Dan Mica - 35,947 (54.5%)

General election
Dan Mica (DEM) -  123,346 (55.3%)
Bill James (REP) - 99,757 (44.7%)

12th congressional district
Democratic primary - Runoff Indicated
John Adams - 17,955 (30.6%)
Edward "Ed" J. Stack - 27,923 (47.6%)
Gerald F. "Jerry" Thompson - 12,812 (21.8%)

Democratic primary runoff'
John Adams - 22,816 (46.8%)
Edward "Ed" J. Stack - 25,985 (53.2%)

Republican primary
J. Herbert Burke - 16,675 (58.3%)
Anthony Lewis Campenni - 11,903 (41.7%)

General election
Edward "Ed" J. Stack (DEM) - 25,985 (53.2%)
J. Herbert Burke (REP) - 66,610 (61.6%)

14th congressional district
Democratic primary
Marcus Ambrose - 2,901 (7.4%)
Sam Brenner - 4,513 (11.6%)
Claude Pepper - 31,597 (81.0%)

Republican primary
Al Cardenas - 7,390 (80.0%)
Evelio S. Estrella - 1,847 (20.0%)

General election
Claude Pepper (DEM) - 65,202 (63.1%)
Al Cardenas (REP) - 38,081 (36.9%)

15th congressional district
Dante B. Fascell (DEM) - 108,837 (74.2%)
Herbert J. Hoodwin (REP) - 37,897 (25.8%)

State Senate
District 2
Edmond M. "Ed" Fortune (DEM) - 45,645 (47.3%)
Tom Tobiassen (REP) - 50,791 (52.7%)

District 11
A. H. "Gus" Craig (DEM) - 28,886 (47.1%)
Vince Fechtel, Jr. (REP) - 32,388 (52.9%)

District 14
George Stuart, Jr. (DEM) - 60,407 (63.3%)
Johnny Bremer (REP) - 35,024 (36.7%)

District 16
Bill Beck (DEM) - 50,928 (43.2%)
Clark Maxwell, Jr. (REP) - 67,051 (56.8%)

District 18
Beverly Roberts (DEM) - 93,629 (42.1%)
John T. Ware (REP) - 128,870 (57.9%)

District 20
T. F. "Tom" Thompson (DEM) - 76,592 (34.0%)
Mary R. Grizzle (REP) - 148,389 (66.0%)

District 23
Pat Frank (DEM) - 91,746 (62.6%)
David Ray (REP) - 54,727 (37.4%)

District 24
Patrick K. "Pat" Neal (DEM) - 35,896 (52.7%)
Andrew Jackson (REP) - 32,242 (47.3%)

District 36
Harry A. Johnston, II (DEM) -  123,133 (56.6%)
William Samuel "Bill" Riker (REP) - 94,533 (43.4%)

District 28
Don C. Childers (DEM) - 140,857 (66.7%)
B. E. "Billie" Brooks (REP) - 70,243 (33.3%)

District 30
Marcia Beach (DEM) - 104,168 (43.1%)
Van B. Poole (REP) - 137,570 (56.9%)

District 32
Ken Jenne (DEM) - 43,798 (74.2%)
Ernette Haring (REP) - 15,231 (25.8%)

District 36
Paul B. Steinberg (DEM) - 100,626 (80.7%)
L. D. G. (Lou) O'Hara (REP) - 23,991 (19.3%)

District 38
Bob McKnight (DEM) - 88,099 (60.0%)
Don J. Gruber (REP) - 58,742 (40.0%)

District 40
Dick Anderson (DEM) - 106,143 (71.2%)
Larry Wicks (REP) - 42,960 (28.8%)

State House
District 2 Democratic primary
Fermon Minshew - 9,364 (39.5%)
Tom Patterson - 14,365 (60.5%)

District 3 Democratic primary
Clyde H. (Jack) Hagler - 16,006 (63.0%)
Jack Kenney - 9,410 (37.0%)

District 3
Clyde H. (Jack) Hagler (DEM) - 30,676 (76.2%)
Charles E. Frederickson (REP) - 9,573 (23.8%)

District 4 Democratic primary
Jim Harkins - 6,900 (21.0%)
Bolley "Bo" Johnson - 10,974  (33.3%)
David Neal - 8,560 (26.0%)
Lynn Toney - 6,498 (19.7%)

District 4 Democratic runoff
Bolley "Bo" Johnson - 18,407  (56.1%)
David Neal - 14,410 (43.9%)

District 5 Democratic primary
Ken Boles - 7,820 (24.4%)
Olivia S. Elmore - 6,404 (20.0%)
Peter R. Gindl - 6,900 (21.5%)
Mike Jones - 6,657 (20.8%)
Mac McDaniels - 4,275 (13.3%)

District 5 Democratic runoff
Ken Boles - 19,972 (62.0%)
Peter R. Grindl - 12,250 (38.0%)

District 5
Ken Boles (DEM) - 29,646 (58.6%)
Jack Gardner (REP) - 20,910 (41.4%)

District 6
James G. Ward (DEM) - 35,815 (70.9%)
John C. Franklin Jr. (REP) - 14,673 (29.1%)

District 8
Ron Johnson (DEM) - 11,073 (59.1%)
Rick Seltzer (REP) - 7,674 (40.9%)

District 19
Andrew E. (Andy) Johnson (DEM) - 38,712 (69.4%)
Janis Betz Lampe (REP) - 17,068 (30.6%)

District 23
Ronnie Bloom (DEM) - 26,582 (43.9%)
Fred Tygart (REP) - 33,983 (56.1%)

District 24
Buck Cochran (DEM) - 28,107 (47.5%)
William "Bill" Bankhead (REP) - 31,082 (52.5%)

District 25
Frank Williams (DEM) - 12,737 (60.9%)
Howard Dunn (REP) - 8,167 (39.1%)

District 26
Sidney Martin (DEM) - 25,948 (79.6%)
David Liberman (REP) - 6,645 (20.4%)

District 28
Hamilton D. Upchurch (DEM) - 12,739 (65.8%)
Pat Malone (REP) - 6,616 (34.2%)

District 33
Bob Hattaway (DEM) - 11,696 (59.0%)
Jean E. Doyle (REP) - 8,130 (41.0%)

District 34
Charles Joseph Knowles (DEM) - 10,654 (42.0%)
Bobby Brantley (REP) - 14,713 (58.0%)

District 35
Everett A. Kelly (DEM) - 12,273 (54.2%)
J. M. (Jim) Hoskinson (REP) - 10,353 (45.8%)

District 38
Bob Wattles (DEM) - 42,584 (48.4%)
Lawrence R. "Larry" Kirkwood (REP) - 45,410 (51.6%)

District 39
Fred Turner (DEM) - 33,427 (38.1%)
John L. Mica (REP) - 54,422 (61.9%)

District 40
Terry Hadley (DEM) - 43,275 (49.6%)
Richard Crotty (REP) - 43,934 (50.4%)

District 41
Fran Carlton (DEM) - 48,651 (53.7%)
Jim Huckeba (REP) - 41,988 (46.3%)

District 42
Suzanne Campbell (DEM) - 34,133 (38.9%)
Toni Jennings (REP) - 53,575 (61.1%)

District 43
Dick J. Batchelor (DEM) - 62,277 (69.2%)
Robert N. Webster (REP) - 27,672 (30.8%)

District 44
David L. Barrett (DEM) - 39,594 (56.9%)
Craig A. Brosius (REP) -  29,945 (43.1%)

District 45
Winston Gardner (DEM) - 36,139 (51.4%)
John Moore (REP) - 34,148 (48.6%)

District 46
Phil Austin (DEM) - 21,389 (30.0%)
Marilyn Evans-Jones (REP) - 49,858 (70.0%)

District 47
Hartzel "Bud" Jennings (DEM) - 25,867 (36.4%)
Tim Deratany (REP) - 31,576 (44.4%)
Glenn A. Blanchard - 13,717 (19.3%)

District 53
Michael "Mike" Tagarelli (DEM) - 38,743 (35.4%)
Peter Dunbar (REP) - 70,585 (64.6%)

District 55
Tom R. Moore (DEM)  - 53,344 (47.8%)
Jim Smith (REP) - 58,148 (52.2%)

District 57
Rick Escarraz (DEM) - 45,807 (42.7%)
Dennis L. Jones (REP) - 61,351 (57.3%)

District 58
Kent G. Whittemore (DEM) - 40,566 (39.0%)
George F. Hieber, II (REP) - 63,576 (61.0%)

District 59
Eddie Mills (DEM) - 50,394 (47.7%)
Bob Melby (REP) - 55,193 (52.3%)

District 61
Don O'Leary (DEM) - 45,932 (42.4%)
Dorothy Eaton Sample (REP) - 62,401 (57.6%)

District 62
Carl Carpenter, Jr. (DEM) -	45,984 (62.1%)
Allan R. Stone (REP) - 28,090 (37.9%)

District 65
Jim Foster (DEM) - 38,450 (51.1%)
John Grant (REP) - 36,811 (48.9%)
District 72
Lawrence F. Shackelford (DEM) - 28,399  (60.6%)
Barbara Shepherd (REP) - 18,467 (39.4%)

District 73
Clyde C. Council (DEM) - 18,547 (34.1%)
Thomas E. Danson, Jr. (REP) - 35,922 (65.9%)

District 75
Wayne H. Duncan (DEM) - 10,674 (33.9%)
Fred Burrall (REP) - 20,848 (66.1%)

District 76
Dale Cassens (DEM)  - 10,870 (47.6%)
Charles (Chuck) Nergard (REP) - 11,988 (52.4%).

District 77
William J. "Bill" Taylor (DEM) - 14,080 (48.3%)
William G. (Doc) Myers (REP) - 15,075 (51.7%)

District 78
Ray Liberti (DEM) - 78,095 (50.9%)
Frank S. Messersmith (REP)  - 75,380 (49.1%)

District 79
Eleanor Weinstock (DEM) - 80,222 (50.6%)
Reid Moore (REP) - 78,456 (49.4%)

District 80
Carol A. Roberts (DEM) - 76,797 (49.3%)
Jim Watt (REP) - 79,094 (50.7%)

District 81
Edward J. Healey (DEM) - 78,776 (51.0%)
R. S. "Bob" Nichols (REP) - 75,615 (49.0%)

District 82
Gene Campbell (DEM) - 79,738 (52.3%)
Anita K. Mitchell (REP) - 72,753 (47.7%)

District 83
J. Justin "J J." Findley (DEM) - 56,306 (37.0%)
Tom Lewis (REP) - 95,864 (63.0%)

District 84 Republican primary
Douglas C. "Doug" Brown - 11,342 (45.2%)
Tom Bush - 13,745 (54.8%)

District 84
Mitch Ceasar (DEM) - 63,697 (46.0%)
Tom Bush (REP) - 74,721 (54.0%)

District 85
Terry O'Malley (DEM) - 84,987 (60.6%)
Stuart L. Stein (REP) - 55,368 (39.4%)

District 86
Linda Cox (DEM) - 79,533 (57.9%)
Marty Sacks (REP) - 57,793 (42.1%)

District 87
Steve Warner (DEM) - 81,105 (59.0%)
Jim Todd (REP) - 56,281 (41.0%)

District 88 Republican primary
Richard Badame - 	11,430 (47.1%)
Jeanne E. Faiks - 12,816 (52.9%)

District 88 general election
Tom Gustafson (DEM) - 93,373 (65.2%)
Jeanne E. Faiks (REP) - 49,746 (34.8%)

District 89 Republican primary
Dave Danziger - 940 (14.6%)
Mary Ellen Hawkins - 5,506 (85.4%)

District 89 general election
Nelson A. Faerber, Jr. (DEM) - 7,305 (27.6%)
Mary Ellen Hawkins (REP) - 19,174 (72.4%)

District 90
Franklin B. (Frank) Mann (DEM) - 37,853 (58.0%)
Bob Privette (REP) - 27,454 (42.0%)

District 91
Isaac "Ike" Anderson, Jr. (DEM) - 17,999 (27.4%)
Hugh Paul Nuckolls (REP) - 47,622 (72.6%)

District 95
Walter C. "Walt" Young (DEM)  - 79,500 (71.9%)
Ronald "Ron" LaDuke (REP) - 31,093 (28.1%)

District 96
Lawrence J. Smith (DEM) - 70,973 (63.8%)
Charles W. Flanagan (REP) - 40,243 (36.2%)

District 98
Elaine Gordon (DEM) - 89,509 (79.7%)
Jim Kohlman (REP) - 22,778 (20.3%)

District 100
Virginia Rosen (DEM) - 84,298 (80.0%)
Rhonda Luihn Sabatino (REP) - 21,042 (20.0%)

District 103
Ronald (Ron) A. Silver (DEM) - 76,895 (75.1%)
Ralph Fine (REP) - 25,518 (24.9%)

District 105
Joe Kershaw (DEM) - 36,876 (68.8%)
Alberto V. Darby (REP) - 16,692 (31.2%)

District 109
Joe Gersten (DEM) - 36,854 (60.0%)
Bud McDougal (REP) - 24,562 (40.0%)

District 110
Roberta Fox (DEM) - 34,884 (58.0%)
Walter W. Sackett, Jr. (REP) - 25,282 (42.0%)

District 111
Alan Rosenthal (DEM) - 28,522 (48.8%)
Tom Gallagher (REP) - 29,866 (51.2%)

District 112 Republican primary
Nancy O. Harrington - 4,375 (53.9%)
Raul R. Oliva - 3,738 (46.1%)

District 112
Lawrence H. "Larry" Plummer (DEM) - 35,645 (61.3%)
Nancy O. Harrington (REP) - 22,540 (38.7%)

District 113
William E. "Bill" Sadowski (DEM) - 36,661 (63.7%)
Ceferino C. Rodriguez (REP) - 20,884 (36.3%)

District 114
Robert (Bob) Hector (DEM) - 35,125 (59.4%)
Don Slesnick, II (REP) - 23,990 (40.6%)

District 116 Democratic runoff
Deborah DeBella - 14,048 (48.2%)
Gene Flinn - 15,099 (51.8%)

District 116
Gene Flinn (DEM) - 54,561 (62.0%)
Tom Endterb (REP) - 33,410 (38.0%)

District 117 Democratic primary
Emmett Benjamin - 7,511 (27.1%)
Bill Flynn - 14,847 (53.5%)
H. Clayton Hamilton - 5,388 (19.4%)

District 117 general election
Bill Flynn (DEM) - 53,852 (60.6%)
Robert "Bob" Godoy (REP) - 34,968 (39.4%)

District 118
John Cyril Malloy (DEM) - 50,923 (60.1%)
Dick Hayes (REP) - 33,784 (39.9%)

District 119 Democratic primary
Eduardo (Eddy) Arango - 4,889 (17.3%)
Larry Hawkins - 6,057 (21.4%)
Thomas (Tom) Holland - 5,346 (18.9%)
John "Fred" Kuhn, Jr. - 2,997 (10.6%)
Dexter Lehtinen - 8,952 (31.7%)

District 119 Democratic runoff
Larry Hawkins - 13,355 (51.1%)
Dexter Lehtinen - 12,767 (48.9%)

District 120
Joe Allen - 7,370 (81.2%)
Cora H. Wilbur - 1,705 (18.8%)

Constitutional Amendments
Revision of Florida Constitution (basic document)
Yes - 623,703 (29.2%)
No - 1,512,106 (70.8%)

Declaration of rights (rev. of Art. I, Sec. 2)
Yes - 1,002,479 (43.1%)
No - 1,323,497 (56.9%)

Legislative [Single-Member Districts and Reapportionment Commission] (rev. Art. III, Sec. 16)
Yes - 982,747 (46.9%)
No - 1,113,394 (53.1%)

Executive [Cabinet] (rev. Art. IV, Secs. (g) 3, 4, 5, 6, 8(a); Art. XI, Sec. 2)
Yes - 540,979 (25.1%)
No - 1,614,630 (74.9%)

Executive [Public Service Commission and Public Counsel] (rev. Art. IV, Sec. 10; Art. V, Sec. 3(b)(3))
Yes - 772,066  (35.9%)
No - 1,375,548 (64.1%)

Judiciary [Selection and retention of circuit and county judges] (rev. Art. V, Secs. 10 and 11 (a) and (b))
Yes - 1,058,574 (49.1%)
No - 1,095,756 (50.9%)

Finance and Taxation (rev. Art. VII; Art. X, Sec. 12(h))
Yes - 779,389 (36.3%)
No - 1,368,346 (63.7%)

Education (rev. Art. IX)
Yes - 771,282 (36.3%)
No - 1,353,986 (63.7%)

Casino gambling (Art. X, Sec. 15)
Yes - 687,460 (28.6%)
No - 1,720,275 (71.4%)

State Attorney and Public Defender
State Attorney (Circuit 20)
Frank C. Alderman (DEM) - 43,515 (40.4%)
Joseph P. D'Alessandro (REP) - 64,128 (59.6%)

Public Defender (Circuit 20)
Douglas M. Midgely (DEM) - 55,356 (53.4%)
Xavier "X" Fernandez (REP) - 48,327 (46.6%)

District Court of Appeal

Florida First District Court of Appeal

Shall Judge Woodrow M. Melvin, Sr. be retained in office?
YES - 194,993 (54.9%)
No - 160,183 (45.1%)

Florida Second District Court of Appeal

Shall Judge Edward F. Boardman be retained in office?
YES - 378,388 (61.3%)
NO - 238,714 (38.7%)

Shall Judge Paul W. Danahy, Jr. be retained in office?
YES - 384,035 (63.2%)
NO - 223,636 (36.8%)

Shall Judge Herboth S. Ryder be retained in office?
YES - 383,128 (63.3%)
NO - 222,439 (36.7%)

Florida Third District Court of Appeal

Shall Judge Thomas H. Barkdull, Jr. be retained in office?
YES - 182,157 (68.5%)
NO - 83,837 (31.5%)

Shall Judge Robert M. Haverfield be retained in office?
YES - 181,789 (70.4%)
NO - 76,580 (29.6%)

Shall Judge James W. Kehoe be retained in office?
YES - 184,840 (71.8%)
NO - 72,458 (28.2%)

Florida Fourth District Court of Appeal

Shall Judge Spencer C. Cross be retained in office?
YES - 324,882 (62.0%)
NO - 199,315 (38.0%)

Shall Judge John H. Moore, II be retained in office?
YES - 334,680 (64.6%)
NO - 183,693 (35.4%)

Circuit Judge

Circuit 4, Group 17
Lawrence D. Fay - 64,145 (54.5%)
John E. Palmer - 53,616 (45.5%)

Circuit 5, Group 1
Carven D. Angel - 43,086 (57.7%)
C. John Coniglio - 31,588 (42.3%)

Circuit 9, Group 1
Ted Coleman - 43,380 (48.4%)
Rom W. Powell - 46,223 (51.6%)

Circuit 11, Group 30
Frederick N. Barad - 165,762 (53.2%)
Carol King Guralnick - 145,988 (46.8%)

Circuit 17, Group: 4
Sheldon Golding - 89,932 (42.3%)
Joseph E. Price - 122,465 (57.7%)

Circuit 19, Group 1
Ken Sharp - 25,381 (55.3%)
Dean Tooker - 20,536 (44.7%)

Circuit 20, Group 2
Ted Brousseau - 49,196 (52.5%)
Thomas R. Brown - 44,433 (47.

References

1978 Florida elections